The Maine International Film Festival, or MIFF, is a 10-day film festival held annually in Waterville, Maine. The festival usually runs in the third week of July at Railroad Square Cinema and the Waterville Opera House. Founded in 1998, the festival showcases independent and international films, with a special focus on Maine and New England themed productions.

The MIFF Midlife Achievement Award is given annually to an actor or filmmaker whose contributions to independent cinema merit recognition. Past honorees include directors Jonathan Demme, Terrence Malick, and Walter Hill, and actors Gabriel Byrne, John Turturro, Ed Harris, Peter Fonda, Lili Taylor, Sissy Spacek and Dominique Sanda. Oscar-winning film editor Thelma Schoonmaker was honored in 2012. Highlights of the honorees' work are incorporated into the festival programming. In 2017 the festival honored Roger Deakins with the inaugural Karl Struss Legacy Award for Distinguished Achievement in Cinematography, named for and dedicated to the pioneering Maine-connected Hollywood cinematographer. The festival does not give awards to individual films and performances, though an audience favorite is determined each year by a balloting process. Past audience favorites include George Washington (2000), The Wild Parrots of Telegraph Hill (2005), The Brand New Testament (2016) and The Children Act (2018).

Since 2013, the festival has highlighted work that pushes the boundaries of commonly accepted notions of film with MIFFONEDGE. Guests have included Brazilian new media artist duo VJ Suave and experimental filmmaker Kerry Laitala.

References

External links
Maine International Film Festival website

Film festivals in Maine
Film festivals established in 1998
Tourist attractions in Kennebec County, Maine
Waterville, Maine